Mae Yuam Noi is a village and tambon (sub-district) of Khun Yuam District, in Mae Hong Son Province, Thailand. In 2005, it had a population of 2,464. The tambon contains eight villages.

References

Tambon of Mae Hong Son province
Populated places in Mae Hong Son province